Linear Algebra and its Applications is a biweekly peer-reviewed mathematics journal published by Elsevier and covering matrix theory and finite-dimensional linear algebra.

History 
The journal was established in January 1968 with A.J. Hoffman, A.S. Householder, A.M. Ostrowski, H. Schneider, and O. Taussky Todd as founding editors-in-chief. The current editors-in-chief are Richard A. Brualdi (University of Wisconsin at Madison), Volker Mehrmann (Technische Universität Berlin), and Peter Semrl (University of Ljubljana).

Abstracting and indexing 
The journal is abstracted and indexed in:

According to the Journal Citation Reports, the journal has a 2020 impact factor of 1.401.

References

External links 
 

Mathematics journals
English-language journals
Elsevier academic journals
Biweekly journals
Publications established in 1968